The Bright House Networks Open was an annual golf tournament for professional women golfers on the Futures Tour, the LPGA Tour's developmental tour. The event was part of the Futures Tour's schedule from 1998 through 2008. From 1998 through 2003, it was played at The Club at Eaglebrooke. From 2004 to 2008, it was played at Cleveland Heights Golf Course. Both courses are located in Lakeland, Florida.

The most recent title sponsor was Bright House Networks, a cable television and digital services provider with headquarters in Syracuse, New York.

The tournament was a 54-hole event, as are most Futures Tour tournaments, and included pre-tournament pro-am opportunities, in which local amateur golfers could play with the professional golfers from the Tour as a benefit for local charities. Charities benefiting from the Bright House Networks Open included The First Tee of Lakeland.

Tournament names through the years: 
2002–2003: Florida Futures Golf Challenge
2004–2007: Lakeland Duramed Futures Classic
2008: Bright House Networks Open

Winners

*Tournament won in sudden-death playoff.

Tournament records

References

External links
Futures Tour official website
Cleveland Heights Golf Course official website
The Club at Eaglebrooke official website

Former Symetra Tour events
Golf in Florida
Sports in Lakeland, Florida
Recurring sporting events established in 1998
Recurring sporting events disestablished in 2008
1998 establishments in Florida
2008 disestablishments in Florida